This is an episode list for the television series Danger Bay.

Series overview

Episodes

Season 1 (1984–85)

Season 2 (1986)

Season 3 (1986–87)

Season 4 (1987–88)

Season 5 (1988–89)

Season 6 (1989–90)

External links
 
 

Danger Bay
Lists of Disney Channel television series episodes